Anticla rutila is a moth in the family Bombycidae. It was described by Herbert Druce in 1887. It is found in Nicaragua.

References

Bombycidae
Moths described in 1887